Cumberland (South Riding) was an electoral district of the Legislative Assembly in the Australian state of New South Wales from 1856 to 1859, in the rural part of Cumberland County, which includes Sydney.  It included all of the county south of Parramatta Road and the Great Western Highway, except for the urban electorates of Sydney (City), Sydney Hamlets, Parramatta and Cumberland Boroughs, which included Liverpool and Campbelltown. It elected two members simultaneously, with voters casting two votes and the first two candidates being elected.

Members for Cumberland (South Riding)

Election results

References

Cumberland (South Riding)
Cumberland (South Riding)
Cumberland (South Riding)
Constituencies disestablished in 1859
1859 disestablishments in Australia